Heartville is an unincorporated community in Effingham County, Illinois. It is located about two miles northeast of Watson, Illinois.

References 

Unincorporated communities in Illinois
Unincorporated communities in Effingham County, Illinois